Pictures at an Exhibition is a suite of ten piano pieces, plus a recurring, varied Promenade theme, composed by Russian composer Modest Mussorgsky in 1874. The piece is Mussorgsky's most famous piano composition, and it has become a showpiece for virtuoso pianists. It became further widely known through various orchestrations and arrangements produced by other composers and musicians, with Maurice Ravel's 1922 adaptation for full symphony orchestra being the most recorded and performed.

Composition history

The composition is based on pictures by the artist, architect, and designer Viktor Hartmann. It was probably in 1868 that Mussorgsky first met Hartmann, not long after the latter's return to Russia from abroad. Both men were devoted to the cause of an intrinsically Russian art and quickly became friends. They likely met in the home of the influential critic Vladimir Stasov, who followed both of their careers with interest. According to Stasov's testimony, in 1868, Hartmann gave Mussorgsky two of the pictures that later formed the basis of Pictures at an Exhibition. In 1870, Mussorgsky dedicated the second song ("In the Corner") of the cycle The Nursery to Hartmann. Stasov remarked that Hartmann loved Mussorgsky's compositions, and particularly liked the "Scene by the Fountain" in his opera Boris Godunov. Mussorgsky had abandoned the scene in his original 1869 version, but at the requests of Stasov and Hartmann, he reworked it for Act 3 in his revision of 1872.

The years 1873–74 are associated with the staging of Boris Godunov, the zenith of Mussorgsky's career as a composer—at least from the standpoint of public acclaim. Mussorgsky's distant relative, friend, and roommate during this period, Arseniy Golenishchev-Kutuzov, describing the January 1874 premiere of the opera, remarked: "During the winter, there were, I think, nine performances, and each time the theatre was sold out, each time the public tumultuously called for Mussorgsky." The composer's victory, however, was overshadowed by the negative press he received from critics. Other circumstances conspired to dampen Mussorgsky's spirits. The disintegration of The Mighty Handful and their failure to understand his artistic goals contributed to the isolation he experienced as an outsider in Saint Petersburg's musical establishment. Golenishchev-Kutuzov wrote: "[The Mighty Handful's] banner was held by Mussorgsky alone; all the other members had left it and pursued his own path ..."

Hartmann's sudden death on 4 August 1873 from an aneurysm shook Mussorgsky along with others in Russia's art world. The loss of the artist, aged only 39, plunged the composer into deep despair. Stasov helped to organize a memorial exhibition of over 400 Hartmann works in the Imperial Academy of Arts in Saint Petersburg in February and March 1874. Mussorgsky lent to the exhibition the two pictures Hartmann had given him, and viewed the show in person. Later in June, two-thirds of the way through composing his song cycle Sunless, Mussorgsky was inspired to compose Pictures at an Exhibition, quickly completing the score in three weeks (2–22 June 1874). In a letter to Stasov (see photo), probably written on 12 June 1874, he describes his progress:

 The music depicts his tour of the exhibition, with each of the ten numbers of the suite serving as a musical illustration of an individual work by Hartmann.

Five days after finishing the composition, he wrote on the title page of the manuscript a tribute to Vladimir Stasov, to whom the work is dedicated. One month later, he added an indication that he intended to have it published.

Golenishchev-Kutuzov gives the following (perhaps biased) account of the work's reception among Mussorgsky's friends and colleagues and an explanation for his failure to follow through on his plans to publish it:

In August, Mussorgsky completed the last two songs of Sunless and then resumed work on Khovanshchina, composing the prelude to Act 1 ("Dawn on the Moscow River") in September.

Publication history

As with most of Mussorgsky's works, Pictures at an Exhibition has a complicated publication history. Although composed very rapidly, during June 1874, the work did not appear in print until 1886, five years after the composer's death, when an edition by the composer's friend and colleague Nikolai Rimsky-Korsakov was published. This edition, however, was not a completely accurate representation of Mussorgsky's score but presented a revised text that contained a number of errors and misreadings.

Only in 1931, marking the 50th anniversary of the composer's death, was Pictures at an Exhibition published in a scholarly edition in agreement with his manuscript, to be included in Volume 8 of Pavel Lamm's M. P. Mussorgsky: Complete Collected Works (1939).

In 1940, the Italian composer Luigi Dallapiccola published an important critical edition of Mussorgsky's work with extensive commentary.

Mussorgsky's hand-written manuscript was published in facsimile in 1975.

{| class="wikitable"
!Year
!Editor
!Publisher
!Notes
|-
|1886
|Nikolay Rimsky-Korsakov
|V. Bessel and Co., Saint Petersburg
|Revised edition 
|-
|1931
|Pavel Lamm
|Muzgiz, Moscow
|Restoration of the composer's score 
|-
|1975
|
|Muzïka, Moscow
|Facsimile of the composer's manuscript
|-
|}

Hartmann's pictures

Mussorgsky based his musical material on drawings and watercolours by Hartmann produced mostly during the artist's travels abroad. Locales include Italy, France, Poland, Russia, and Ukraine. Today most of the pictures from the Hartmann exhibition are lost, making it impossible to be sure in many cases which Hartmann works Mussorgsky had in mind.

Arts critic Alfred Frankenstein gave an account of Hartmann, with reproductions of his pictures, in the article "Victor Hartmann and Modeste Mussorgsky" in The Musical Quarterly (July 1939). Frankenstein claimed to have identified seven pictures by catalogue number, corresponding to:
"Tuileries" (now lost)
"Ballet of the Unhatched Chicks"
"Samuel Goldenberg and Schmuÿle" (Frankenstein suggested two separate portraits, still extant, as the basis for "Two Jews: Rich and Poor")
"Catacombs"
"The Hut on Hen's Legs"
"The Bogatyr Gates"
The surviving works that can be shown with certainty to have been used by Mussorgsky in assembling his suite, along with their titles, are as follows:

{| class="wikitable"
!Movement
!Title
!Title (English)
!Picture
|-
|5. Ballet of the Unhatched Chicks
|Эскизы театральных костюмов к балету "Трильби"
|Sketches of theatre costumes for the ballet Trilby
|
|-
| rowspan=2 |6. "Samuel" Goldenberg and "Schmuÿle"
|Еврей в меховой шапке. Сандомир
|Jew in a fur cap. Sandomierz
|
|-
|Сандомирский [еврей]
|Sandomierz [Jew]
|
|-
|8. Catacombs (Roman Tomb)
|Парижские катакомбы (с фигурами В. А. Гартмана, В. А. Кенеля и проводника, держащего фонарь)
|Paris Catacombs (with the figures of V. A. Hartmann, V. A. Kenel, and a guide holding a lantern)
|
|-
|9. The Hut on Hen's Legs ([The Hut] of Baba Yaga)
|Избушка Бабы-Яги на курьих ножках. Часы в русском стиле
|The hut of Baba-Yaga on hen's legs. Clock in the Russian style
|
|-
|10. The Bogatyr Gates (In the Capital in Kyiv)
|Проект городских ворот в Киеве. Главный фасад
|Project for city gates in Kyiv. Main façade
|
|-
|}
Note: Mussorgsky owned the two pictures that together inspired No. 6, the so-called "Two Jews". The title of No. 6b, as provided by the Soviet editors of his letters, is Сандомирский [еврей] (Sandomirskiy [yevrey] or Sandomierz [Jew]). The bracketed word yevrey ( "Hebrew") is the sanitized form of the actual word in the title, very likely the derogatory epithet жид (zhid or yid).

Movements
Vladimir Stasov's program, identified below, and the six known extant pictures suggest the ten pieces that make up the suite correspond to eleven pictures by Hartmann, with "Samuel Goldenberg und Schmuÿle" accounting for two. The five Promenades are not numbered with the ten pictures and consist in the composer's manuscript of two titled movements and three untitled interludes appended to the first, second, and fourth pictures.

Mussorgsky links the suite's movements in a way that depicts the viewer's own progress through the exhibition. Two Promenade movements stand as portals to the suite's main sections. Their regular pace and irregular meter depicts the act of walking. Three untitled interludes present shorter statements of this theme, varying the mood, colour, and key in each to suggest reflection on a work just seen or anticipation of a new work glimpsed. A turn is taken in the work at the "Catacombae" when the Promenade theme stops functioning as merely a linking device and becomes, in "Cum mortuis", an integral element of the movement itself. The theme reaches its apotheosis in the suite's finale, "The Bogatyr Gates".

The first two movements of the suite—one grand, one grotesque—find mirrored counterparts, and apotheoses, at the end. The suite traces a journey that begins at an art exhibition, but the line between observer and observed vanishes at the Catacombs when the journey takes on a different character.

The table below shows the order of movements.

{| class="wikitable"
!
!Title in score
!English translation
! style="width: 57px;" |Key
! style="width: 45px;" |Meter
!Tempo
|-
|
|Promenade
|
|B major
| align="center" | , 
|Allegro giusto, nel modo russico; senza allegrezza, ma poco sostenuto
|-
| align="center" | 1
|Gnomus (Latin)
|The Gnome
|E minor
| align="center" | 
|Vivo and Meno mosso, pesante
|-
|
|Promenade
|
|A major
| align="center" | , 
|Moderato commodo assai e con delicatezza
|-
| align="center" | 2
|Il vecchio castello (Italian)
|The Old Castle
|G minor
| align="center" | 
|Andante molto cantabile e con dolore
|-
|
|Promenade
|
|B major
| align="center" | , 
|Moderato non tanto, pesamente
|-
| align="center" | 3
|Tuileries (Dispute d'enfants après jeux) (French)
|Tuileries (Children's Quarrel after Games)
|B major
| align="center" | 
|Allegretto non troppo, capriccioso
|-
| align="center" | 4
|Bydło (Polish)
|Cattle
|G minor
| align="center" | 
|Sempre moderato, pesante
|-
|
|Promenade
|
|D minor
|Tranquillo
|-
| align="center" | 5
|Балет невылупившихся птенцов (Russian)Balet nevylupivshikhsya ptentsov
|Ballet of Unhatched Chicks
|F major
| align="center" | 
|Scherzino
|-
| align="center" | 6
|"Samuel" Goldenberg und "Schmuÿle" (Yiddish)
|"Samuel" Goldenberg and "Schmuÿle"
|B minor
| align="center" | 
|Andante. Grave energico and Andantino
|-
|
|Promenade
|
|B major
|Allegro giusto, nel modo russico; poco sostenuto
|-
| align="center" | 7
|Limoges. Le marché (La grande nouvelle) (French)
|Limoges. The Market (The Great News)
|E major
| align="center" | 
|Allegretto vivo, sempre scherzando
|-
| rowspan="2" align="center" | 8
|Catacombae (Sepulcrum romanum) (Latin)
|Catacombs (Roman Tomb)
|B minor
| align="center" | 
|Largo
|-
|Cum mortuis in lingua mortua (Latin)
|With the Dead in a Dead Language
|B minor
| align="center" | 
|Andante non troppo con lamento
|-
| align="center" | 9
|Избушка на курьих ножках (Баба-Яга) (Russian)Izbushka na kuryikh nozhkakh (Baba-Yaga)
|The Hut on Hen's Legs (Baba Yaga)
|C minor
| align="center" | 
|Allegro con brio, feroce and Andante mosso
|-
| align="center" | 10
|Богатырские ворота (В стольном городе во Киеве) (Russian)Bogatyrskiye vorota (V stolnom gorode vo Kiyeve)
|The Bogatyr Gates (In the Capital in Kiev)(Often translated as "The Great Gate of Kiev" or "The Heroes' Gate at Kiev")
|E major
| align="center" | 
|Allegro alla breve. Maestoso, con grandezza
|}

Promenade

Vladimir Stasov's comment: In this piece Mussorgsky depicts himself "roving through the exhibition, now leisurely, now briskly in order to come close to a picture that had attracted his attention, and at times sadly, thinking of his departed friend."

The piece has simple, strong rhythms in asymmetrical meter. The promenade theme is shown below:

1. The Gnome
Stasov's comment: "A sketch depicting a little gnome, clumsily running with crooked legs."

Hartmann's sketch, now lost, is thought to represent a design for a nutcracker displaying large teeth. The lurching music, in contrasting tempos with frequent stops and starts, suggests the movements of the gnome.

Promenade (2nd)

A placid statement of the promenade melody depicts the viewer walking from one display to the next.

2. The Old Castle
Stasov's comment: "A medieval castle before which a troubadour sings a song."

This movement is thought to be based on a watercolor depiction of an Italian castle and is portrayed in Ravel's orchestration by a bassoon and alto saxophone duet. Hartmann often placed appropriate human figures in his architectural renderings to suggest scale.

Promenade (3rd)

Another brief statement of the promenade melody (8 measures) gives it more extroversion and weight than before.

3. Tuileries (Children's Quarrel after Games)
Stasov's comment: "An avenue in the garden of the Tuileries, with a swarm of children and nurses."

Hartmann's picture of the Jardin des Tuileries near the Louvre in Paris (France) is now lost. Figures of children quarrelling and playing in the garden were likely added by the artist for scale (see note on No. 2 above).

The movement is cast in through-composed ternary form (ABA).

4. Cattle

Stasov's comment: "A Polish cart on enormous wheels, drawn by oxen."

The movement is cast in through-composed ternary form (ABA) with coda. Mussorgsky's original piano version of this movement begins fortissimo, suggesting that the lumbering oxcart's journey begins in the listener's foreground. After reaching a climax (con tutta forza), the dynamic marking is abruptly piano (bar 47), followed by a diminuendo to a final pianississimo, suggesting the oxcart receding into the distance. Rimsky-Korsakov's edition, and arrangements based on it such as Ravel's, begin quietly, build gradually (crescendo) to fortissimo and then undergo a diminuendo, suggesting the oxcart approaching, passing the listener, and then receding.

Promenade (4th)

A reflective 10-measure presentation of the promenade theme.

5. Ballet of Unhatched Chicks
Stasov's comment: "Hartmann's design for the décor of a picturesque scene in the ballet Trilby."

Gerald Abraham provides the following details: "Trilby or The Demon of the Heath, a ballet with choreography by Petipa, music by Julius Gerber, and décor by Hartmann, based on Charles Nodier's Trilby, or The Elf of Argyle, was produced at the Bolshoi Theatre, Saint Petersburg, in 1871. The fledglings were canary chicks."

The movement is cast in ternary form (ABA) with a literal repeat and terse extension (coda).

6. "Samuel" Goldenberg and "Schmuÿle" 

Stasov's comment: "Two Jews: rich and poor"

Stasov's explanatory title elucidates the personal names used in Mussorgsky's original manuscript. Published versions display various combinations, such as "Two Polish Jews, Rich and Poor (Samuel Goldenberg and Schmuyle)". The movement is thought to be based on two separate extant portraits.

The use of augmented second intervals approximates Jewish modes such as the Phrygian dominant scale. The movement is in ternary form :

Andante, grave energico (Theme 1 "Samuel Goldenberg")
Andantino (Theme 2 "Schmuÿle")
Andante, grave energico (Themes 1 and 2 in counterpoint)
Coda

Promenade (5th)

A nearly bar-for-bar restatement of the opening promenade. Differences are slight: condensed second half, block chords voiced more fully. Structurally, the movement acts as a reprise, giving listeners another hearing of the opening material before these are developed in the second half of the suite.

Many arrangements, including Ravel's orchestral version, omit this movement.

7. Limoges. The Market (The Great News)
Stasov's comment: "French women quarrelling violently in the market."

Limoges is a city in central France. Mussorgsky originally provided two paragraphs in French that described a marketplace discussion (the 'great news'), but subsequently crossed them out in the manuscript.

The movement is a scherzo in through-composed ternary form (ABA). A scurrying coda leads without a break into the next movement.

8. Catacombs (Roman Tomb) – With the Dead in a Dead Language 

Stasov's comment: "Hartmann represented himself examining the Paris catacombs by the light of a lantern."

The movement is in two distinct parts. Its two sections consist of a nearly static Largo consisting of a sequence of block chords with elegiac lines adding a touch of melancholy and a more flowing, gloomy Andante that introduces the Promenade theme into the scene.

The first section's alternating loud and soft chords evoke the grandeur, stillness, and echo of the catacombs. The second section suggests a merging of observer and scene as the observer descends into the catacombs. Mussorgsky's manuscript of "Catacombs" (shown right) displays two pencilled notes, in Russian: "NB – Latin text: With the dead in a dead language" and, along the right margin, "Well may it be in Latin! The creative spirit of the dead Hartmann leads me towards the skulls, invokes them; the skulls begin to glow softly."

9. The Hut on Fowl's Legs (Baba Yaga)

Stasov's comment: "Hartmann's drawing depicted a clock in the form of Baba Yaga's hut on fowl's legs. Mussorgsky added the witch's flight in a mortar."

A scherzo marked Feroce with a slower middle section. Motives in this movement evoke the bells of a large clock and the whirlwind sounds of a chase. Structurally, the movement mirrors the grotesque qualities of "Gnomus" on a grand scale.

The movement is cast in ternary form (ABA):

Allegro con brio, feroce
Andante mosso
Allegro molto (a nearly literal repeat)
Coda

The coda leads without a break into the final movement of the suite.

10. The Bogatyr Gates (In the Capital in Kiev)
Stasov's comment: "Hartmann's sketch was his design for city gates at Kiev in the ancient Russian massive style with a cupola shaped like a slavonic helmet."

Bogatyrs are heroes that appear in Russian epics called bylinas. Hartmann designed a monumental gate for Tsar Alexander II to commemorate the monarch's narrow escape from an assassination attempt on April 4, 1866. Hartmann regarded his design as the best work he had done. His design won the national competition but plans to build the structure were later cancelled.

The movement's grand main theme exalts the opening Promenade much as "Baba Yaga" amplified "Gnomus"; also like that movement, it evens out the meter of its earlier counterpart. The solemn secondary theme is based on a baptismal hymn from the repertory of Russian Orthodox chant.

The movement is cast as a broad rondo in two main sections: ABAB–CADA. The first half of the movement sets up the expectation of an ABABA pattern. The interruption of this pattern with new music just before its expected conclusion gives the rest of the movement the feeling of a vast extension. This extended leave-taking acts as a coda for the suite as a whole.

A: Main Theme (forte, then fortissimo); maestoso
B: Hymn Theme (piano) (A minor); senza espressione (without expression)
A: Main Theme (forte); descending and ascending scale figures suggest carillons.
B: Hymn Theme (fortissimo) (E minor); senza espressione
C: Interlude/Transition (mezzo forte with crescendo to forte); promenade theme recalled. Suggestions of clockwork, bells, ascent.
A: Main Theme (fortissimo); Meno mosso, sempre maestoso. Triplet figuration.
D: Interlude/Transition (mezzo forte with crescendo). Triplets.
A: Main Theme (fortissimo); Grave, sempre allargando. The tempo slows to a standstill by the final cadence.

Recording of the original manuscript 
In 2009 the German pianist  published the original version of Gnomus on his Mussorgsky album (Enharmonic) as a premiere. In 2014 the Russian pianist Andrej Hoteev presented (in a CD recording) a performance of "Pictures at an Exhibition" based on original manuscripts<ref>[http://andrej-hoteev.com/discography.html Discographie] </ref> he consulted in the Russian National Library at Saint Petersburg. Hoteev found numerous discrepancies with conventional sheet music editions. He believes his recorded version expresses the composer's original intent. The most important deviations are documented with illustrations from the manuscripts in the accompanying CD booklet.

Arrangements and interpretations

The first musician to arrange Mussorgsky's Pictures at an Exhibition for orchestra was the Russian composer and conductor Mikhail Tushmalov. However, his version (first performed in 1891 and possibly produced as early as 1886 when he was a student of Rimsky-Korsakov) does not include the entire suite: Only seven of the ten "pictures" are present, leaving out "Gnomus", "Tuileries", and "Cattle", and all the Promenades are omitted except for the last one, which is used in place of the first.

The next orchestration was undertaken by the British conductor Henry Wood in 1915. He recorded a few sections of his arrangement on a pair of acoustic Columbia 78rpm discs in 1920. However, he withdrew his version when Maurice Ravel's orchestration was published, and banned every public performance in the 1930s in deference to Ravel's work. Wood's arrangement has also been recorded by the London Philharmonic Orchestra under Nicholas Braithwaite and issued on the Lyrita label. All but the first of the Promenade movements were omitted and other passages extensively re-composed. Wood's orchestration was once described by Gordon Jacob as "superior to Ravel's in picturesqueness and vividness", with its off-stage camel-bells in "Cattle" and grand organ in "The Great Gate of Kyiv".

The first person to orchestrate the piece in its entirety was the Slovenian-born conductor and violinist Leo Funtek, who finished his version in 1922 while living and working in Finland.

The version by Maurice Ravel, produced in 1922 on a commission by Serge Koussevitzky, represents a virtuoso effort by a master colourist. The orchestration has proved the most popular in the concert hall and on record.

Ravel omitted the Promenade between "Samuel Goldenberg and Schmuÿle" and "Limoges" and applied artistic license to some particulars of dynamics and notation. His instrumental colors—a trumpet solo for the opening Promenade, dark woodwind tones for passages suggesting Orthodox chant, the piccolo and high strings for the children's "chicks in shells"—are widely admired. The influence of Ravel's version may often be discerned in subsequent versions of the suite.

Koussevitzky's commission, worked out with the publishers of the piano suite, gave him sole conducting rights for several years. He conducted the first performance in Paris on October 19, 1922. He published Ravel's score himself and in 1930 made the first recording of it with the Boston Symphony Orchestra. The exclusive nature of his commission prompted the release of a number of contemporary versions by other arrangers until Ravel's became generally available.

The original publisher of Mussorgsky's piano suite, W. Bessel & Co. rushed to produce an orchestral version of its own after Ravel's proved popular. The publisher had passed on the opportunity to publish Ravel's arrangement, seeing no great commercial advantage in printing a score and set of parts for large orchestra; it had granted Koussevitzky permission to commission the setting and publish the score himself on the condition that no one else be allowed to perform it. Bessel turned to a Ravel student, 21-year-old Russian-born pianist Leonidas Leonardi (1901–1967), a.k.a. Leon Leonardi or Leonid Leonardi, to create an orchestral version that could meet the now burgeoning demand and help the publisher regain some of its lost advantage. Leonardi's orchestration requires even larger forces than the version made by his mentor. The young pianist dedicated his setting of the suite to Igor Stravinsky and conducted the premiere in Paris with the Lamoureux Orchestra on 15 June 1924. The US premiere took place on 4 December 1924 when the New York Symphony Orchestra performed it under the baton of Walter Damrosch. Regardless, Leonardi's orchestration was soon eclipsed by Ravel's, and today only the third Promenade and "Tuileries" movement of his version may be heard on audio record (Leonard Slatkin/Saint Louis Symphony: The Slatkin Years: 6 CD Set).

Another arrangement appeared when Eugene Ormandy took over the Philadelphia Orchestra in 1936 following Leopold Stokowski's decision to resign the conductorship. Ormandy wanted a version of Pictures of his own and commissioned Lucien Cailliet, the Philadelphia Orchestra's 'house arranger' and player in the woodwind section, to produce one. This version was premiered and recorded by Ormandy in 1937. Walter Goehr published a version in 1942 for smaller forces than Ravel but curiously dropped "Gnomus" altogether and made "Limoges" the first piece.

The conductor Leopold Stokowski had introduced Ravel's version to Philadelphia audiences in November 1929; ten years later he produced his own very free orchestration (incorporating much re-composition), aiming for what he called a more Slavic orchestral sound instead of Ravel's more Gallic approach. Stokowski revised his version over the years and made three gramophone recordings of it (1939, 1941 and 1965). The score, finally published in 1971, has since been recorded by other conductors, including Matthias Bamert, Gennady Rozhdestvensky, Oliver Knussen and José Serebrier.

Although Ravel's version is most often performed and recorded, a number of conductors have made their own changes to the scoring, including Arturo Toscanini, Nikolai Golovanov, and James Conlon. Conductor and pianist Vladimir Ashkenazy produced his own orchestral arrangement, expressing dissatisfaction with Ravel's interpretive liberties and perpetuation of early printing errors. The conductor Leonard Slatkin has performed compendium versions, in which each Promenade and picture is interpreted by a different orchestral arranger.

Many other orchestrations and arrangements of Pictures have been made. Most show debts to Ravel; the original piano composition is, of course, frequently performed and recorded. A version for chamber orchestra exists, made by Taiwanese composer Chao Ching-Wen. Elgar Howarth arranged it for the Philip Jones Brass Ensemble in 1977, subsequently recasting it for Grimethorpe Colliery Band. Kazuhito Yamashita wrote an adaptation for solo classical guitar. Excerpts have also been recorded, including a 78 rpm disc of "The Old Castle" and "Catacombs" orchestrated by Sir Granville Bantock, and a spectacular version of "The Great Gate of Kyiv" was scored by Douglas Gamley for full symphony orchestra, male voice choir and organ. The Amadeus Orchestra (UK) commissioned ten composers to orchestrate one movement each to make a version first performed complete in 2012. Movements were provided by Alastair King, Roger May, Tolib Shakhidi, David Butterworth, Philip Mackenzie, Simon Whiteside, Daryl Griffiths, Natalia Villanueva, James McWilliam and Julian Kershaw.

The suite has inspired homages in a broad range of musical styles. Emerson, Lake & Palmer's version incorporated elements of progressive rock, jazz and folk music (1971/2008). An electronic music adaptation by Isao Tomita was done in 1975. A heavy metal arrangement of the entire suite was released by German band Mekong Delta; another metal band, Armored Saint, utilised the "Great Gate of Kyiv" theme as an introduction for the track "March of the Saint". In 2002 electronic musician-composer Amon Tobin paraphrased "Gnomus" for the track "Back From Space" on his album Out from Out Where. In 2003 guitarist-composer Trevor Rabin released an electric guitar adaptation of the Promenade originally intended for the Yes album Big Generator and later included on his demo album 90124. In 2005 Animusic 2 included a track entitled "Cathedral Pictures", which included only the first Promenade and the final two movements from the suite. The Michael Jackson song "HIStory" samples a short section of "The Great Gate of Kiev", with a longer part featured during the HIStory World Tour 5 minute-countdown before the MJ-2040 spaceship departs, a snippet before continuing They Don't Care About Us and in the flag parade finale in 1996/97. Re-issues of the HIStory album further changed the sample on the track. The same thing can be heard in the Michael Jackson: 30th Anniversary Celebration, which during the Jacksons's ultimate medley, after Can You Feel It, the song starts and then ABC starts.

Orchestrations

A partial listing of orchestral arrangements of Pictures at an Exhibition:

 Mikhail Tushmalov (ca. 1886; three pictures and four Promenades omitted: recorded by Marc Andreae and the Munich Philharmonic for BASF)
 Henry Wood (1915; four Promenades omitted: recorded by Nicholas Braithwaite and the London Philharmonic for Lyrita)
 Leo Funtek (1922; all Promenades included: recorded by Leif Segerstam and the Finnish Radio Symphony for BIS; Also on Teldec Laser-disc with Vladimir Ashkenazy conducting the Swedish Radio Symphony Orchestra)
 Maurice Ravel (1922; the fifth Promenade omitted)
 Giuseppe Becce (1922; for "salon-orchestra". No Promenades are included at all, and only some of the Pictures.)
 Leonidas Leonardi (1924); for large symphony orchestra, arranged by a pupil of Ravel's.
 Lucien Cailliet (1937: recorded by Eugene Ormandy and the Philadelphia Orchestra for RCA and reissued on Biddulph)
 Leopold Stokowski (1939; third Promenade, "Tuileries", fifth Promenade and "Limoges" omitted. Three recordings conducted by Stokowski himself: with the Philadelphia Orchestra, All-American Youth Orchestra, and New Philharmonia.
 Walter Goehr (1942; "Gnomus" omitted; includes a subsidiary part for piano)
 Sergei Gorchakov (1954: recorded by Kurt Masur and the London Philharmonic for Teldec; Also recorded with Karl Anton Rickenbacher, conducting the Krakow Radio Symphony, for the RCA Records. A live 1980 performance by the Leningrad Academic Symphony Orchestra under Konstantin Simeonov was recorded by Melodya.)
 Nikolai Golovanov (A heavily edited version of Ravel's orchestration in which Golovanov omits all but the first of the Promenades was recorded for Melodya)
 Lawrence Leonard (1977; for piano and orchestra; recorded by Tamas Ungar, piano, with Geoffrey Simon and the Philharmonia Orchestra for Cala)
 Vladimir Ashkenazy (1982: recorded by Ashkenazy and the Philharmonia Orchestra for Decca/London)
 Francisco Mignone (date unknown; discovered after the composer's death in 1986)
 Thomas Wilbrandt (1992)
 Émile Naoumoff (ca. 1994, in concerto style with some added music, for piano and orchestra; recorded with Igor Blaschkow conducting the Deutsches Symphony Orchestra Berlin, for Wergo)
 Mekong Delta (1997; for group and orchestra)
  (2001), for sixteen players or chamber orchestra
 Jason Wright Wingate (2003; orchestra, organ and chorus)
 Hidemaro Konoye (date unknown)
 Leonard Slatkin – Two compendium versions, the second of which he recorded with the BBC Symphony Orchestra for Warner Classics live at the BBC Proms on 1 September 2004; the other recording was with the Nashville Symphony for Naxos Records.
 Václav Smetáček (date unknown; a performance with Gennady Rozhdestvensky conducting the Prague Symphony Orchestra on 28 October 2004 has been issued on the Don Industriale label)
 Jukka-Pekka Saraste created a performing edition of his own, combining the orchestrations of Leo Funtek and Sergei Gorchakov, recorded with the Toronto Symphony Orchestra for Finlandia Records, a division of Warner Music Group
 Amadeus Orchestra version, with one picture each provided by Alastair King, Roger May, Tolib Shakhidi, David Butterworth, Philip Mackenzie, Simon Whiteside, Daryl Griffiths, Natalia Villanueva, James McWilliam and Julian Kershaw. (2012, for large orchestra)
 Peter Breiner (2012, for large orchestra), recorded by Breiner and the New Zealand Symphony Orchestra for Naxos Records.
 Tomasz Golka (2019, for full orchestra, based on Mussorgsky's original manuscript; includes all of the composer's original movements, unusual rhythms, harmonies, and notations that Rimsky-Korsakov later modified) This version includes an additional movement composed by Golka, "What about Shmuel and Shmulik Goldenberg?!", which is the orchestrator's "response to and musical commentary on the anti-semitism of Mussorgsky's Goldenberg movement."

Arrangements for concert band
 Erik W. G. Leidzén for the Edwin Franko Goldman band (1941; in three parts. Part 1 includes Promenade, The Old Castle, Tuileries, Bydło, and Ballet of the Unhatched Chickens, part 2 includes The Market Place at Limoges and Catacombs, and part 3 includes The Hut Of Baba-Yaga and The Great Gate of Kyiv); published by Carl Fischer, Inc.
 James Curnow (1985; for large wind ensemble; abridged version)
 Paul Lavender for the United States Marine Band (2012; transcription of Ravel's original orchestration)

Arrangements for other ensembles
Arrangements of Pictures at an Exhibition for performing ensembles other than orchestra:

 Giuseppe Becce (1930; for piano trio)
 Vladimir Horowitz (1946; revised version for solo piano)
 Ralph Burns (1957; for jazz orchestra)
 Allyn Ferguson (ca. 1963; for jazz orchestra)
 Calvin Hampton (1967; for organ)
 Emerson, Lake & Palmer (1971; rock group, lyrics written by Greg Lake); see Pictures at an Exhibition (Emerson, Lake & Palmer album)
 Harry van Hoof (ca. 1972; brass ensemble; "The Bogatyr Gates" only)
 Keith Chapman (1972; for the Wanamaker Organ)
 Isao Tomita (1966; various instruments for the Osamu Tezuka animated film)
 Isao Tomita (1975; for synthesizer)
 Elgar Howarth (ca. 1977; for brass ensemble. Recorded in 1977 by the Philip Jones Brass Ensemble for Argo)
 Ray Barretto (1979; "The Old Castle" for Latin-jazz band)
 Arthur Wills (1970s; for organ. Recorded in 1980 by Wills on the Organ of Ely Cathedral for Hyperion)
 Jon Faddis (1978; for trumpet, in his solo album Good and Plenty with the track name "Promenade")
 Kazuhito Yamashita (1980; for classical guitar)
 Henk de Vlieger (1981; for percussion ensemble)
 Hugh Lawson (1983; for jazz trio)
 Jean Guillou (ca. 1988; for organ)
 Peng Xiuwen (1989; for modern Chinese orchestra; Recorded in 1990 by China Broadcasting Chinese Orchestra, China Record Co. CCD90-085)
 Jevgenija Lisicina (ca. 1991; for three pipe organs; ca. 1997 for organ and 14 percussion instruments)
 Tangerine Dream (1994; Promenade for trumpet, saxophone, horns and synthesizer; on their Turn of the Tides album)
 Mekong Delta (1997; for metal band)
 Christian Lindberg (ca. 2000; for trombone and piano)
 Simon Proctor (ca. 2000; for euphonium & tuba quartet, retitled Miniatures at an Exhibition)
 Wayne Lytle, for the DVD Animusic 2 under the title Cathedral Pictures (2005; for synthesizer; Promenade, "Baba Yaga" and "The Bogatyr Gates")
 Cameron Carpenter (2006, for organ)
 Walter Hilgers (2006; for large brass ensemble, percussion, and two harps)
 Glass Duo (2007; for glass harp)
 Slav de Hren (2008; for a punk-jazz band and vocal ensemble. Some of the pieces are complete transcriptions, others are improvisations on the original theme)
 Friendly Rich (2009; for avant-garde cabaret jazz ensemble)
 Clarice Assad (2009; for string orchestra, piano and percussion)
  (2011; for jazz trio and orchestra)
 Robert W. Smith (2012; Madison Scouts Drum And Bugle Corps)
 Neil Cicierega (2014; for Smash Mouth–based mashup album "Mouth Sounds"; Promenade, made up of samples taken from "All Star" by Smash Mouth)

 William Schmidt (date unknown; for saxophone choir);
 Andrés Segovia (date unknown; for guitar; "The Old Castle" only)
 Ward Swingle (date unknown; for vocal ensemble, double bass and percussion; Limoges only)
Boris Ivanov (2018; for synthesizers and rock band; entire suite)

 Stage adaptations 

Staging by Kandinsky
In 1928, the Russian artist Wassily Kandinsky created a stage show by combining his own designs for the pictures with a performance of the piano score. Since it was put on at Dessau, elements of the staging have been lost. However, it has proved possible to animate the surviving art work using video technology.

Staging by Gen Atem and S213
In a hall on Attisholz-Areal, Switzerland, Gen Atem and S213 had a premiere performance on the basis of Ravel's orchestration of Mussorgsky's piano cycle in August 2021. Kaspar Zehnder and the Theatre Orchester Biel Solothurn provided the acoustical background in its entirety.

Ballet by Alexei Ratmansky
In 2014, choreographer Alexei Ratmansky created the ballet Pictures at an Exhibition, based on the orchestral score, for the New York City Ballet. The set featured a 1913 painting by Wassily Kandinsky, unrelated to Kandinsky’s 1928 staging.

Notes

References

Sources
 (originally published: Dutton, New York)

Further reading
Calvocoressi, Michel D., Modest Mussorgsky: His Life and Works. London: Rockliff; Fair Lawn, New Jersey: Essential Books, 1956.
Dubal, David, The Art of the Piano: Its Performers, Literature, and Recordings, third edition, revised and expanded. With accompanying CD recording. Pompton Plains, New Jersey: Amadeus Press, 2004. .
Mussorgsky, M., Pictures from an Exhibition (score), edited by N. Rimsky-Korsakov. Saint-Petersburg: V. Bessel & Co., 1886
Orga, Ates, "Mussorgsky's Pictures at an Exhibition on record". International Piano Quarterly 2, no. 5 (Autumn 1998): 32–47.
Schonberg, Harold C. The Lives of the Great Composers'', revised edition. New York: W. W. Norton, 1981. . London: Abacus, 1997. .

External links

 
 Reproductions of Viktor Hartmann’s pictures
 Another page with reproductions (German)
 Performance of Pictures at an Exhibition on piano by Alexander Ghindin from the Isabella Stewart Gardner Museum in MP3 format
 A Clinton Nieweg Chart for orchestrations and arrangements on SOLC
 
 
 List of recordings, arrangements, film and video use, other works based on Pictures, David DeBoor Canfield web site
 The 16bit pictures at an exhibition – arrangement for Commodore Amiga by Michael Briel
Listening guide to Pictures at an Exhibition based on Simon Tedeschi's recording on ABC Classics.

Suites (music)
Orchestral suites
Compositions for solo piano
Funerary and memorial compositions
Compositions by Modest Mussorgsky
1874 compositions
Music based on art
Mussorgsky
Baba Yaga